Joe Rizzo (born  December 17, 1950 in Glen Cove, New York)  is a former linebacker of the Denver Broncos. He played for the Broncos from 1974 to 1980 and was a starter in Super Bowl XII and member of the Orange Crush Defense. He had 9 career interceptions. He was part of one of the most dominant linebacking corps in NFL history.  Known as the Orange Crush, it consisted of, Joe Rizzo, Randy Gradishar, Tom Jackson and Bob Swenson. The corp was named the 9th best linebacking corps in NFL history by nfl.com. Joe was also voted by Bronco fans as one of the top 10 linebackers in the 50-year history (1959-2009) of the Denver Broncos.  
 
A commercial real estate broker since 1984, Joe owns a commercial real estate firm and resides in Wilmington, NC.

References

1950 births
Living people
American football linebackers
Denver Broncos players
Merchant Marine Mariners football players
People from Nassau County, New York
Players of American football from New York (state)
American people of Italian descent
Glen Cove High School alumni